Uday Bhanu (1926-2019) was a Hindi poet. He born in Daira Din Panah, Muzaffargarh, Punjab, Pakistan. He was bestowed with the title of the state poet of Haryana when Haryana became a state in 1966.

Publications

Poetry
 Bhedion Ke Dhang
 Hans Muktavali
 Sant Sipahi
 Desan Mein Des Haryana
 Sankh aur Shehnai
 Uday Bhanu Hans Rachanawali 1
 Uday Bhanu Hans Rachanawali 2
 Uday Bhanu Hans Rachanawali 3
 Uday Bhanu Hans Rachanawali 4

Books written about him
 Uday Bhanu Hans Ki Kavya Sadhna
 Udaybhanu Hans Ke Partinidhi Geet
 Kavya Sarovar Ka Hans

Awards
When Haryana became a separate state in 1966, Uday Bhanu was declared as its state poet of Haryana. He was awarded Sur Puruskar in 2006 and Haryana Sahitya Rattan Samman in 2009 by Haryana Sahitya Akademi. Uday Bhanu Hans Awards are given every year in his honour.

Personal life
Uday Bhanu was born on 2 August 1926 at Daira Din Panah in Muzaffargarh district of Pakistan. His family shifted to Hisar after partition of India in 1947 when he was 22 years old. He completed his Master of Arts in Hindi language and joined as a teacher. Yashpal Sharma was one of his students. He retired as principal of Government College, Hisar and lived in Hisar. He was also the secretary of Chandigarh Sahitya Akademi and a member of advisory committee of Haryana Sahitya Akademi.

References

People from Muzaffargarh District
People from Muzaffargarh
Poets from Haryana
People from Hisar (city)
Hindi-language writers
1926 births
2019 deaths
20th-century Indian poets
21st-century Indian poets